The 1971 Lehigh Engineers football team was an American football team that represented Lehigh University as an independent during the 1971 NCAA College Division football season.

In their seventh year under head coach Fred Dunlap, the Engineers compiled an 8–3 record. John Hill and Gary Scheib were the team captains.

Lehigh played its home games at Taylor Stadium on the university campus in Bethlehem, Pennsylvania.

Schedule

References

Lehigh
Lehigh Mountain Hawks football seasons
Lehigh Engineers football